XHPARC-FM is a radio station on 101.7 FM in Tecomán, Colima. It is owned by Grupo Radiofónico ZER and known as Limón FM with a Regional Mexican format.

History
XHPARC was awarded in the IFT-4 radio auction of 2017 on an uncontested bid and began broadcasting in February 2020.

References

Radio stations in Colima
Radio stations established in 2020
2020 establishments in Mexico